The 135th New York State Legislature, consisting of the New York State Senate and the New York State Assembly, met from January 3 to March 29, 1912, during the second year of John Alden Dix's governorship, in Albany.

Background
Under the provisions of the New York Constitution of 1894, re-apportioned in 1906 and 1907, 51 Senators and 150 assemblymen were elected in single-seat districts; senators for a two-year term, assemblymen for a one-year term. The senatorial districts were made up of entire counties, except New York County (twelve districts), Kings County (eight districts), Erie County (three districts) and Monroe County (two districts). The Assembly districts were made up of contiguous area, all within the same county.

At this time there were two major political parties: the Republican Party and the Democratic Party.

Elections
The New York state election, 1911, was held on November 7. No statewide elective offices were up for election. For the first time, a Socialist was elected to the Assembly.

Sessions
The Legislature met for the regular session at the State Capitol in Albany on January 3, 1912; and adjourned on March 29.

Edwin A. Merritt, Jr. (R) was elected Speaker with 95 votes against 45 for Al Smith (D).

On April 19, Bronx County was created by the Legislature, to be effectively separated from New York County on January 1, 1914. To date, this was the last county created in the State of New York.

State Senate

Districts

Members
The asterisk (*) denotes members of the previous Legislature who continued in office as members of this Legislature.

Employees
 Clerk: Patrick E. McCabe
 Sergeant-at-Arms: Harry E. Oxford
 Assistant Sergeant-at-Arms: John J. Dillon
 Principal Doorkeeper: Fred W. Theobold
 Assistant Doorkeeper: Thomas Nolan
 Stenographer: William E. Reynolds

State Assembly
Note: For brevity, the chairmanships omit the words "...the Committee on (the)..."

Assemblymen

Employees
 Clerk: Fred W. Hammond
 Sergeant-at-Arms: Harry W. Haines
 Principal Doorkeeper: Michael Kehoe
 First Assistant Doorkeeper: James B. Hulse
 Second Assistant Doorkeeper: D. C. Easton
 Stenographer: Henry C. Lammert
Postmaster: James H. Underwood

Notes

Sources
 Official New York from Cleveland to Hughes by Charles Elliott Fitch (Hurd Publishing Co., New York and Buffalo, 1911, Vol. IV; see pg. 367 for senators)
 Journal of the Senate (135th Session) (1912; Vol. I)
 Journal of the Assembly (135th Session) (1912; Vol. I; from January 3 to March 20)
 Journal of the Assembly (135th Session) (1912; Vol. II; from March 20 to 29)
 REPUBLICANS SEE BIG GAINS AHEAD in NYT on October 29, 1911
 COMMITTEE PLUMS GO TO MERRITT BACKERS in NYT on January 11, 1912

135
1912 in the United States
1912 in New York (state)
1912 U.S. legislative sessions